Idi Papez was an Austrian pair skater. With partner Karl Zwack, she was the 1933 European Champion and was a three-time World medalist

Results
with Karl Zwack

References

Navigation

Austrian female pair skaters
World Figure Skating Championships medalists
European Figure Skating Championships medalists